There are two species of snake named sand dunes blackhead:
 Apostolepis arenaria
 Apostolepis gaboi